Minos Argyrakis (Aydın, 1919 – Athens, 26 May 1998) was a Greek painter, sketcher and scenic designer.

References

Bibliography 

 Minos Argyrakis, Οδός Ονείρων, ίδια έκδοση, 1957. Επανέκδοση: Εκδ. Δέκα, Αθήνα, αγνώστου ημερομηνίας.
 Minos Argyrakis, Ο γύρος του Κόσμου, εκδ. Γαλαξία, Αθήνα, 1964.
 Minos Argyrakis, Η Πολιτεία Έπλεε εις την Μελανόλευκον, εκδ. Θεμέλιο, Αθήνα, 1963
 Minos Argyrakis, Travelling in Greece, Kastaniotis Publications, Αθήνα 1984.
 Konstantinos Papachristou, 'Minos Argyrakis: an unknown side of his. His techno-criticism in the magazine 'Greek Creation'". Chrisanthos Christou, Tribute, Aristotle University of Thessaloniki, p. 239-243, Thessaloniki, 2006.

External links 

 "Spontaneous and witty" — I. Mortoglou, newspaper Rizospastis, 18 February 2001.

Greek scenic designers
Greek cartoonists
Greek painters
People from Aydın
1919 births
1998 deaths
Emigrants from the Ottoman Empire to Greece